Jonathan Lamont Williams (born November 22, 1985) is a professional gridiron football defensive lineman who is currently a free agent. He played college football for the South Carolina Gamecocks. He has been a member of the Arkansas Twisters, BC Lions, Spokane Shock, Toronto Argonauts, Ottawa Redblacks and Saskatchewan Roughriders. He was selected by the Redblacks in the first round of the 2013 CFL Expansion Draft and played there for two seasons before being released prior to the 2016 season. On June 15, 2016, Williams signed with the Saskatchewan Roughriders.

External links
Just Sports Stats
Ottawa Redblacks bio

1985 births
Living people
American players of Canadian football
American football defensive linemen
Canadian football defensive linemen
South Carolina Gamecocks football players
Arkansas Twisters players
BC Lions players
Spokane Shock players
Ottawa Redblacks players
Saskatchewan Roughriders players
Toronto Argonauts players
Players of American football from Augusta, Georgia